Gideon Acquah (born 24 May 2000) is a Ghanaian footballer who currently plays as a defender for Extremadura, on loan from Medeama.

Career statistics

Club

Notes

References

2000 births
Living people
Ghanaian footballers
Ghanaian expatriate footballers
Association football defenders
Ghana Premier League players
Bofoakwa Tano F.C. players
Medeama SC players
Ghanaian expatriate sportspeople in Spain
Expatriate footballers in Spain
Ghana youth international footballers